Marc Janson (21 January 1930 – 12 January 2022) was a Belgian-born French painter. He was considered to be a surrealist.

Biography
Janson moved to Paris in 1948 and often stayed in Rosselló. Many of his works were acquired by the Fonds national d'art contemporain and exhibited at the Musée d'Art Moderne de Paris. He died in Paris on 12 January 2022, at the age of 91.

References

1930 births
2022 deaths
20th-century French painters
21st-century French painters
French people of Belgian descent
People from Brussels